Esteban Alonso Calvo Oreamuno (born 24 May 1997) is a Costa Rican footballer who plays as a defender.

Career

FC Tucson
Following the conclusion of his collegiate career, Calvo joined FC Tucson of USL League One in March of 2020. He made his league debut for the club on 25 July 2020, playing the entirety of a 2-1 away victory over Fort Lauderdale CF.

Richmond Kickers
On 9 February 2021, Calvo made the move to USL League One side Richmond Kickers.

References

External links
Esteban Calvo at FC Tucson
Esteban Calvo at University of Portland Athletics

FIU Panthers men's soccer players
Portland Pilots men's soccer players
SIMA Águilas players
FC Golden State Force players
FC Tucson players
Richmond Kickers players
USL League Two players
USL League One players
Costa Rican footballers
Association football defenders
Costa Rican expatriate footballers
1997 births
Living people